Stella's Favor, originally Mi fai un favore, is a 1996 Italian comedy film directed by Giancarlo Scarchilli.

Cast  
 Ornella Muti: Stella
 Maria Amelia Monti: Roberta
 Claudio Bigagli: Leonardo
 Jo Champa: Stefania
 Alessandro Gassman: Rodolfo
 Franco Interlenghi: Mario 
 Marisa Merlini: Amelia 
 Paola Tiziana Cruciani: Cecilia
 Urbano Barberini: Tommy 
 Julienne Liberto: Claudia
 Ewa Aulin: Dyane

References

External links

1996 films
1996 comedy films
Italian comedy films
Films scored by Luis Bacalov
1990s Italian-language films
1990s Italian films